A Simple Plan may refer to:

 A Simple Plan (novel), a 1993 novel by American novelist Scott Smith
 A Simple Plan (film) a 1998 film based on the novel of the same name
"A Simple Plan", a song by Matt Brouwer from the 2005 album Unlearning

See also 
Simple Plan, a pop punk band
 Simple Plan (album)
The Simple Plan, a 2022 EP by August is Falling
 SIMPLE IRA, a type of retirement plan in the United States